Ride for Refuge is a non-competitive cycling event that partners with 175+ independent charities annually and raises awareness and funds for displaced persons, the vulnerable, and the exploited. The event occurs internationally, at locations in Canada and the United States. Ride for Refuge was started in Canada in 2004, by the Christian missionary organization International Teams Canada. In its first year, Ride for Refuge took place in one city, Kitchener, Ontario, and there were only 25 cyclists. As of 2014, the Ride for Refuge has raised more than $5,000,000.00 for their charitable partners. Teams that enter in the event can choose from a list of approved charities for whom to fundraise Teams can choose to support orphans, homeless people, refugees, human trafficking victims, and other displaced peoples.

References

External links
 Website

2004 establishments in Ontario
Annual events in Canada
Annual sporting events in the United States
Charities based in Canada
Charity events in Canada
Charity events in the United States
Christian events
Christian organizations established in 2004
Christian sports organizations
Christianity in North America
Cycling events in Canada
Cycling events in the United States
Cycling organizations in Canada
Cycling organizations in the United States
Organizations based in Ontario
Kitchener, Ontario
Homelessness charities
International organizations based in the Americas
Recurring sporting events established in 2004
Refugee aid organizations in Canada
Social welfare parachurch organizations